Luc-Christopher Matutu (born 8 September 1990) is a French professional footballer who plays as a left-back.

References

External links
 

1991 births
Living people
Footballers from Paris
Association football defenders
French footballers
Championnat National players
Championnat National 2 players
Championnat National 3 players
First Professional Football League (Bulgaria) players
Aviron Bayonnais FC players
AS Beauvais Oise players
FC Lokomotiv 1929 Sofia players
US Sénart-Moissy players
French sportspeople of Republic of the Congo descent
French expatriate footballers
French expatriate sportspeople in Germany
Expatriate footballers in Germany
French expatriate sportspeople in Bulgaria
Expatriate footballers in Bulgaria
Black French sportspeople